Sha'r Awtar was a king from the Hashid tribe related to Banu Hamdan which took control over the Kingdom of Saba'. His rule was contemporary with a rival tribe led by Il Sharih Yahdhib. 

He led many campaigns against Hadhramaut and Axum in which he managed to defeat them.

See also
List of rulers of Saba and Himyar

References

History of Yemen
Middle Eastern kings